Charles Darling was a college football and baseball player for the Boston College Eagles. A triple threat, he played quarterback and fullback on the football team. Darling was captain of the 1923 team. Darling made various All-American selections.

References

American football quarterbacks
American football fullbacks
Boston College Eagles football players
Boston College Eagles baseball players
Baseball outfielders
All-American college football players